Evgeniy Erofaylov (born 29 August 1975) is a Uzbekistani wrestler. He competed in the men's Greco-Roman 76 kg at the 2000 Summer Olympics.

References

1975 births
Living people
Uzbekistani male sport wrestlers
Olympic wrestlers of Uzbekistan
Wrestlers at the 2000 Summer Olympics
Place of birth missing (living people)
Wrestlers at the 2002 Asian Games
Asian Games competitors for Uzbekistan
Asian Wrestling Championships medalists
20th-century Uzbekistani people
21st-century Uzbekistani people